Linnéas fina visor (English: Linnea's fine songs) is a studio album by the Swedish-Dutch folk singer-songwriter Cornelis Vreeswijk.

Track listing
 En vacker visa till Linnéa
"Alices snaps"
"Till Mtukwa Rosa Lind"
"Linnéa i galopp"
"Bakvända visan"
"Silas' kalas"
"Ofelia plockar krasse"
"Polaren Per vid morgonstädningen"
 Till Linnéa via Leonard Cohen
"Linnéas morgonpsalm"
"Balladen om bonden och djävulen"
"Blues för Ann-Katarin"

Personnel
 Cornelis Vreeswijk – vocals, guitar
 Peter Nieuwerf – guitar
 Harry Mooten – accordion
 Gerrit Den Braber – backing vocals
 Willem de Vries – drums, percussion
 Piet Souer – harmonica

References

Cornelis Vreeswijk albums
1973 albums